Elections took place in Huron County, Ontario on October 27, 2014 in conjunction with municipal elections across the province.

Huron County Council
Huron County Council consists of the Mayors and Reeves of each constituent municipality, plus deputy mayors, deputy reeves for all municipalities except Howick, Morris-Turnberry and North Huron

For the 2014 election, Huron County Council will be reduced from 16 to 15 councillors, with the removal of one council seat from Bluewater.

Ashfield-Colborne-Wawanosh

Bluewater

Central Huron

Goderich

Howick

Huron East

Morris-Turnberry

North Huron

South Huron

References

Huron
Huron County, Ontario